The United States Virgin Islands national under-20 soccer team represents US Virgin Islands in international soccer at this age level and is controlled by U.S. Virgin Islands Soccer Federation, the governing body for soccer in US Virgin Islands.

2011 CONCACAF U-20 Championship qualifying

Qualifying playoff 

United States Virgin Islands advance with a 3–0 aggregate over Turks and Caicos Islands.

Group stage

Group C

Recent results

Current squad 
The following players were called for the 2011 CONCACAF U-20 Championship qualifying.

|-
! colspan="9"  style="background:#b0d3fb; text-align:left;"|
|- style="background:#dfedfd;"

See also 
United States Virgin Islands national soccer team

Under-20
Caribbean national under-20 association football teams